Benno Erdmann (30 May 1851, Guhrau – 7 January 1921, Berlin) was a German neo-Kantian philosopher, logician, psychologist and scholar of Immanuel Kant.

Biography
Erdmann received his Ph.D. in 1873 from the University of Berlin with a dissertation on Kant. The title of his thesis was Die Stellung des Dinges an sich in Kants Aesthetik und Analytik. Hermann von Helmholtz proposed Erdmann's publication Die Axiome der Geometrie (1877) as the basis for a habilitation. In 1878 he became an associate professor at the University of Berlin, in 1879 a full professor at the University of Kiel, and in 1884 he went to the University of Breslau, in 1890 to the University of Halle, in 1898 to the University of Bonn and in 1909 he returned to Berlin.

He was the father of journalist Lothar Erdmann.

Works 
 Martin Knutzen und seine Zeit. 1876
 Die Axiome der Geometrie, eine philosophische Untersuchung der Riemann-Helmholtz'schen Raumtheorie. 1877
Kant's Kriticismus in der ersten und in der zweiten Auflage der Kritik der reinen Vernunft. 1878
 Logik. Bd. 1. Logische Elementarlehre. 1892 (review by Bernard Bosanquet in Mind (1892), N.S. No. 2)
 Abhandlungen zur Philosophie und ihrer Geschichte. 1893
 Psychologische Untersuchungen über das Lesen auf experimenteller Grundlage. 1898
 Die Psychologie des Kindes, und die Schule. 1901
 Historische Untersuchungen über Kants Prolegomena. 1904
 Über Inhalt und Geltung des Kausalgesetzes. 1905
 Umrisse zur Psychologie des Denkens. 1908
 Über den modernen Monismus. 1914

References
 Lüder Gäbe, "Erdmann, Benno." In: Neue Deutsche Biographie (NDB). Vol. 4, Duncker & Humblot, Berlin 1959, p. 570ff.

External links 
 

German logicians
German psychologists
19th-century philosophers
20th-century German philosophers
19th-century German writers
19th-century German male writers
Academic staff of the University of Bonn
Academic staff of the University of Kiel
Academic staff of the University of Breslau
Academic staff of the Martin Luther University of Halle-Wittenberg
Academic staff of the Humboldt University of Berlin
1851 births
1921 deaths
People from Góra
People from the Province of Silesia